Neil Shaffer (born February 14, 1989 in Aliquippa, Pennsylvania) is a retired American soccer player. Shaffer currently plays for amateur Pittsburgh side Tartan Devils Oak Avalon.

Career

College and amateur
Shaffer attended Beaver High School and played four years of college soccer at the Robert Morris University. Following his senior season, Shaffer was named to the NSCAA Men's Division I All-North Atlantic Region Third Team and to the All-Northeast Conference Second Team. He finished his college career with 13 goals and nine assists for 35 career points.

During his college years, Shaffer also played for Erie Admirals in the National Premier Soccer League.

Professional
Undrafted out of college, Shaffer turned professional in 2011 when he signed for the Pittsburgh Riverhounds of the USL Professional Division. He made his professional debut on May 21, 2011 in a game against F.C. New York.

Kitsap Pumas
In 2013 Shaffer scored 5 goals in 14 appearances for the USL PDL side.

Harrisburg City Islanders
After a productive 2013 season Shaffer signed with the USL side and helped the team make it to the USL-PRO Championship Game. During his time in Harrisburg Neil made large strides toward helping the local humane society. In fact, he donated his entire salary to science in effort to research k9 behavior and cognitive abilities. He currently owns two guinea pigs Sam and Jackson.

Neil was a fan favorite during his time at City Island. His technical ability was so fantastic that fans never knew whether he was left footed or right footed. I do not think any still knows to this day......

Indy Eleven
On December 23, 2015, Shaffer signed with the NASL side, Indy Eleven

On 6 May 2016, Shaffer was loaned back to Harrisburg City Islanders for their weekend series of games against FC Cincinnati and Charleston Battery on 7th and 9 May.

References

External links
 RMU bio

1989 births
Living people
American soccer players
Robert Morris Colonials men's soccer players
Pittsburgh Riverhounds SC players
Kitsap Pumas players
Penn FC players
Indy Eleven players
Soccer players from Pennsylvania
USL Championship players
USL League Two players
Association football midfielders